Kkavyanjali  is an Indian television romantic drama series that aired on Star Plus from 25 January 2005 to 28 August 2006. The series starred Anita Hassanandani, Rakshak Sahni and Eijaz Khan.

It is the tale of two lovers who can never meet, soulmates who love each other deeply but are separated.

Plot

Kkavya Nanda, a charming and eligible young man, is the only son of the late Mayank Nanda (Ronit Roy) and his wife, Nitya Nanda (Amrita Singh). He is the sole heir to more than half of the Nanda group of industries.

Kkavya is coming back to India after many years and everyone in the close-knit joint family is eagerly awaiting his return. A series of parties and celebrations have been planned to welcome him. And in one such party, Kkavya sees a beautiful girl who leaves a lasting impression on his mind.

After this first encounter, he repeatedly sees the same girl in various places, but is not able to speak to her on all occasions. However, her memory haunts him and eventually, he finds himself falling in love with this mysterious woman.

It was the biggest launch of 2005, for Indian soap, the serial made big news by being the comeback vehicle of Amrita Singh, Vidya Sinha and Natassha. The television ratings provided much support to the serial even in mid-August 2005, the show became the #1 show of India. But the death of the male protagonist, (Eijaz Khan) (Kkavya) made things worse. But with the entry of (Mohammed Iqbal Khan) as Shaurya and a change in the storyline, the serial recovered its lost position.

It's been a year since Kkavya's death. Anjali has become a stronger person. She is performing Kkavya's duties in the family and is looking after the family business as well. It's the perfect match of a modern woman, who is also traditional.

Recently a lookalike of Kkavya named Soham (Eijaz Khan) has entered the program, Anjali had made out to the family that he is Kkavya so she can find the murderer of Kkavya. Soham seems to be an evil character.

However soon after finding out about Kkavya's killer which was Yug, Soham decides to prove to Anjali that the killer is Yug (Hiten Tejwani) but Yug tries to blame Kkavya and Nitya's death on Shaurya but everything is found out by Soham and he brings proof and Yug kills himself.

Soon after that Soham realises that he loves Anjali but so does Shaurya. Anjali also starts to love him and Shaurya sees this in their eyes so when Shaurya and Anjali are about to get married, Shaurya stops the wedding and says bad stuff about Anjali and Soham says out loud Anjali is not and he also shouts out that he loves her. Shaurya said he knew as it was his plan to bring out his feelings. Then Soham and Anjali get married and live happily ever after with the blessings of the family.

Cast

Main
 Anita Hassanandani as Anjum Anjali Salve / Anjali Kkavya Nanda / Anjali Soham Saxena 
 Rakshak Sahni / Eijaz Khan as Kkavya Nanda
 Eijaz Khan as Dr. Soham Nanda / Saxena

Recurring
 Amrita Singh as Nitya Nanda
 Mohammed Iqbal Khan as Shaurya Nanda
 Sushmita Mukherjee as Romilla Nanda
 Sailesh Gulabani as Nihaal Nanda
 Achala Sachdev / Zohra Sehgal as Bebe
 Ronit Roy as Mayank Nanda
 Vikrant Rai as Jai Nanda
 Aarun Nagar as Arun
 Pradeep Kharab / Sandeep Baswana as Shlok Nanda
 Nandini Singh as Pammi Mittal
 Kishwer Merchant as Vanshita Nanda
 Megha Gupta as Disha Jai Nanda
 Talat Rekhi as Yash Nanda
 Vidya Sinha as Sharmila Nanda
 Soni Singh / Barkha Bisht as Arpita Nanda / Arpita Vansh Malhotra
 Shabbir Ahluwalia as Vansh Malhotra
 Chaitanya Choudhury as Vayu Kapoor
 Nisha Sareen as Disha Jai Nanda
 Shivalika Sharma as Rohina Nanda
 Hiten Tejwani as Yug Mittal
 Riva Bubber as Sonia
 Madhumalti Kapoor as Khala
 Savita Prabhune as Mrs. Salve
 Sudhir Dalvi as Mr. Salve
 Poonam Joshi as Bindiya
 Ali Asgar as Adeep Nanda
 Akshay Anand as Aman Kapoor
 Abir Goswami as Aarav Nanda
 Rupali Ganguly as Mona Mittal
 Dheeraj Sarna as Chaman
 Aashish Kaul as Mr. Malhotra
 Anjali Mukhi as Mrs. Malhotra
 Karan Patel as Kanishk Malhotra
 Roshni Chopra as Reeva
 Salil Acharya as Sandeep (Sandy) Nanda
 Arunima Sharma as Priya
 Nirmal Pandey as Navin Nanda
 Rocky Verma as Mr. Sad
 Kanika Maheshwari as Neha
 Manasi Parekh as Akshara

Special appearances
 Shweta Tiwari as Prerna
 Neha Bamb
 Sakshi Tanwar (twice) as Parvati
 Smriti Zubin Irani
 Achint Kaur
 Jitendra
 Aamna Shariff as Kashish
 Rakshanda Khan

Production
₹90 Million had been spent on the marketing of the series before its premiere.

Mainly filmed in India at Mumbai, one of the show's sequences was filmed at Hong Kong during 2005 for a total of ten episodes, and by collaboration with Hong Kong Tourism Board, various domestic locations were promoted in the series.

In a sequence, to depict a deluge in  Mumbai at that time (2005), about 80 tankers were used to create false floods, with the main lead caught admitting it.

In June 2006, the series had a crossover with Kahaani Ghar Ghar Kii.

In March 2005, Rakshak Sahni playing Kkavya was replaced in the series, due to his incapability of bringing life into his role and also when he wanted for a ten-day break and Eijaz Khan was made to quit Kahiin To Hoga for Sahni's role.

Bollywood actress Amrita Singh and Vidya Sinha made their television debut with the series.

Days before its end, in August 2006, Amrita Singh quit the series owing professional ethics followed by the death of her character.

Reception
Kkavyanjali which premiered at 9:30pm (IST), which Producer Ekta Kapoor considered one of her critical show at that time with a great hope, was touted as the best fiction launch of the year 2005 but did not receive the expected success.

It opened with a rating of 13.91 TVR on 25 January and averaged 11.7 in that week, becoming the ninth-most-watched Hindi TV show overall. Specifically, in Gujarat and Madya Pradesh it received 21 TVR and 29.4 TVR. However, the following weeks, the ratings dipped. In May 2006, when the storyline took a leap and with entry of Iqbal Khan, it improved quite a bit which was not sufficient to get the expected ratings. It got off-aired in August 2006 because of the conflict between Ekta Kapoor's Balaji Telefilms and Star Plus due to its change in storyline and time slot from 9:30 to 9:00 pm (IST), which received quite less ratings then in that slot compared to their rival channel Zee TV's Saat Phere:Saloni Ka Safar.

The show got the awards in both categories i-e Technical and Programming for both Jury and Popularity. Kahaani Ghar Ghar Kii had a drop in its ratings in 2005, so Ekta Kapoor (producer) crossed it over with Kkavyanjali after which Kahaani saw a spike in its ratings. Anita Hassanandani charged 40 thousand per day at that time. The show was also shot in Hong Kong. Pritam charged 20 lakhs for its unique music composition.

Awards

 Indian telly awards  
Best actor in a supporting role Akshit j Sharma

References

External links
 
 "Kavyanjali" Star TV, United Kingdom
 "Kavyanjali on Star Content Syndication"

Balaji Telefilms television series
2005 Indian television series debuts
2006 Indian television series endings
Indian television soap operas
Indian romance television series
Indian mystery television series
StarPlus original programming
Television shows set in Himachal Pradesh
Television shows set in Mumbai